South Carolina Highway 87 (SC 87) was a state highway that existed in the northern part of Anderson County and the southwestern part of Pickens County. It connected rural areas of Anderson County with Pendleton and Central.

Route description
SC 87 began at an intersection with SC 13 (now SC 93) in Central. It headed nearly due south to Pendleton, where it first intersected US 76/SC 28 (now SC 28 Business) and then following those two highway until it met the western terminus of SC 88. It headed southeast to an intersection with US 178, north of Northlake. It then headed to the east-southeast until it met its eastern terminus, an intersection with SC 81, northwest of Aaron.

History
SC 87 was established between US 178 and SC 81. In 1942, it was extended through Pendleton to its western terminus. It was decommissioned in 1947 and was downgraded to secondary roads. Today, parts of it is known as Harris Bridge Road, Lebanon Road, and Issaqueena Trail.

Major intersections

See also

References

External links
Former SC 87 at the Virginia Highways South Carolina Annex

087
Transportation in Pickens County, South Carolina
Transportation in Anderson County, South Carolina
Central, South Carolina
Pendleton, South Carolina